Trésor Gautier Makunda (born 15 September 1983) is a Paralympian athlete from France competing mainly in category T11 sprint events. Makunda has won a total of one silver and three bronze medals across three Summer Paralympics, beginning with a second-place finish in the T11 10mm sprint at the 2004 Summer Paralympics in Athens. He is a regular member of the French relay team in the T11-13 4 × 100 m relay.

He appeared in the 2011 Regis Wargnier film La Ligne droite.

References

External links
 
 

1983 births
Living people
French male sprinters
Paralympic athletes of France
Paralympic silver medalists for France
Paralympic bronze medalists for France
Athletes (track and field) at the 2004 Summer Paralympics
Athletes (track and field) at the 2008 Summer Paralympics
Athletes (track and field) at the 2012 Summer Paralympics
Medalists at the 2004 Summer Paralympics
Medalists at the 2008 Summer Paralympics
Medalists at the 2012 Summer Paralympics
Paralympic medalists in athletics (track and field)
Sportspeople from Kinshasa
Athletes (track and field) at the 2020 Summer Paralympics
Medalists at the 2020 Summer Paralympics
21st-century Democratic Republic of the Congo people
20th-century French people
21st-century French people